Ravinder Bhogal is a food writer, restaurateur, British chef, journalist and stylist. She opened her first restaurant Jikoni in Marylebone, London in September 2016.

Bhogal's work and food spans flavours and culinary traditions from the Far East, India & South Asia, the Middle East, East Africa and Britain and she celebrates the idea of immigrant cuisine.

Ravinder has written several cookbooks, and writes a regular monthly column for the FT Weekend.

Early life 
Born in Nairobi, Kenya, Bhogal grew up in London.

Career

Television appearances 
Bhogal made her first TV appearance when she won a competition in search of the new Fanny Cradock, judged by Gordon Ramsay and Angela Hartnett on series 3 of The F Word in 2007.

Ravinder travelled the world to investigate the journeys of different foods and farming practices in Channel 4's "Food: What's in your Basket" with co-host Jay Rayner and has also hosted Ravinder's Kitchen, a culinary TV series that premiered in October 2013 on TLC.

Books 
Her debut book Cook in Boots won the Gourmand World Cookbook Award for the UK's Best First Cookbook and was awarded the first runners-up prize of the World's Best First Cookbook at the Paris Cookbook Fair in February 2010. The Gourmand World Cookbook Awards feature around 26,000 books from 136 countries. Cook in Boots was released in 2009 by HarperCollins.

Ravinder's latest book Jikoni: Proudly Inauthentic Recipes from an Immigrant Kitchen, published by Bloomsbury, and has a release date of 9 July 2020.

Awards and achievements 
She has twice been included in the Evening Standard Progress 1000 list as one of London's leading influencers of progress and diversity in the capital. Ravinder won the Asian Women of Achievement Award in Association with RBS in Media in 2013.

References 

Living people
British television chefs
British food writers
Cookbook writers
Year of birth missing (living people)
Women food writers
Women cookbook writers
British people of Indian descent
British people of Punjabi descent
Kenyan emigrants to the United Kingdom